Dunwood Camp is the site of an Iron Age hillfort located in Hampshire. It occupies the summit of a sandy hill. It has a single Rampart (fortification) but no definite indication of a ditch and it is possible that this earthwork was never completed.

Location
The site lies on part of the former  golfcourse at Dunwood Manor Golf Club to the north of Dunwood Manor, and to the northeast of Romsey in Hampshire. The site lies at a summit of 93m AOD.

References



Iron Age sites in England
Buildings and structures in Hampshire
Hill forts in Hampshire
Archaeological sites in Hampshire